MystiCon is an American science fiction convention held in Roanoke, Virginia. The name "MystiCon" was chosen by the membership as a tribute to an earlier series of Virginia conventions with that name. The organizers include members that left SheVaCon, another Virginia-based science fiction convention, citing concerns with management and operations.

Past events
MystiCon 2011 was held from February 25–27, 2011, with David Gerrold as the author guest of honor, Randy Asplund as the artist guest of honor, and scream queen Brinke Stevens as the media guest of honor.  The convention took place at the Tanglewood Holiday Inn in Roanoke, Virginia.

MystiCon 2012 was held from February 24–26, 2012, at the Tanglewood Holiday Inn in Roanoke, Virginia. The official attendance was 866 people.  Guests included Sherrilyn Kenyon as the author guest of honor and Ursula Vernon as the artist guest of honor.  Nicki Clyne was the media guest of honor. Richard Hatch was a late addition as a media co-guest of honor.
With the convention doubling is size from the previous year it received regional as well as national coverage.

MystiCon 2013 was held from February 22–24, 2013, at the Tanglewood Holiday Inn in Roanoke, Virginia. Guests included Orson Scott Card as the Author Guest of Honor, Peter Davison as the Media Guest of Honor, and Larry Elmore as the Artist Guest of Honor. Additionally, Bella Morte returned as the Musical Guest of Honor. Steven S. Long was the Gaming Guest of Honor.

MystiCon 2014 was held from February 21–23, 2014, at the Tanglewood Holiday Inn in Roanoke, Virginia.  Guests included Todd McCaffrey as the Author Guest of Honor, John de Lancie as the Media Guest of Honor and John Jennings as the Artist Guest of Honor. Additionally, Bella Morte returned as the Musical Guest of Honor. Kenneth Hite was the Gaming Guest of Honor.

MystiCon 2015 event was held from February 27 through March 1, 2015, at the Tanglewood Holiday Inn in Roanoke, Virginia. Sean Maher was the Media Guest of Honor, Alan Dean Foster was to be the Author Guest of Honor but unfortunately had to cancel so Peter David came in his stead, Scott Rorie was the Artist Guest of Honor, Kevin McKeever was the Industry Guest of Honor and Bella Morte returned as the Musical Guest of Honor. Other guests will be named later.

MystiCon 2016 event was scheduled to be held from February 26 through February 29, 2016, at the Tanglewood Holiday Inn in Roanoke, Virginia. George R.R. Martin was the Media and Author Guest of Honor, J.P. Targete was the Artist Guest of Honor, John Watts was the Gaming Guest of Honor, Linda Shuping Smith is the Fan Guest of Honor, Rich Sigfrit was the Emcee, and Bella Morte had returned as the Musical Guest of Honor. Other guests will be named later.

Upcoming events

References

External links 

 

Science fiction conventions in the United States
Recurring events established in 2011
Roanoke, Virginia
2011 establishments in Virginia